Percy is a village in Randolph County, Illinois, United States. The population was 970 at the 2010 census.

Geography

Demographics

As of the census of 2000, there were 942 people, 387 households, and 250 families residing in the village. The racial makeup of the village was 98.94% White, 0.21% African American, 0.21% Native American, 0.32% from other races, and 0.32% from two or more races. Hispanic or Latino of any race were 2.23% of the population.

There were 387 households, out of which 28.4% had children under the age of 18 living with them, 51.9% were married couples living together, 10.3% had a female householder with no husband present, and 35.4% were non-families. 30.5% of all households were made up of individuals, and 16.0% had someone living alone who was 65 years of age or older. The average household size was 2.33 and the average family size was 2.89.

In the village, the population was spread out, with 22.0% under the age of 18, 9.7% from 18 to 24, 27.8% from 25 to 44, 21.4% from 45 to 64, and 19.1% who were 65 years of age or older. The median age was 39 years. For every 100 females, there were 88.0 males. For every 100 females age 18 and over, there were 84.7 males.

The median income for a household in the village was $31,333, and the median income for a family was $35,956. Males had a median income of $28,043 versus $20,385 for females. The per capita income for the village was $15,524. About 8.1% of families and 11.3% of the population were below the poverty line, including 20.7% of those under age 18 and 3.5% of those age 65 or over.

References

External links
 Randolph County Herald Tribune - Local newspaper

Villages in Randolph County, Illinois
Villages in Illinois